"Tease Me/Bad Guys" is a song by Nigerian singer Wizkid. It was officially released on  2 April 2010, serving as the second single from his debut album Superstar (2011). The song was produced by Samklef. Its music video features cameo appearances from Skales, Samklef, D'Prince, Ice Prince, M.I, Jesse Jagz, ELDee, Dr SID, Wande Coal and Banky W.

Music video
The accompanying music video for "Tease Me/Bad Guys" was shot and directed by Kemi Adetiba at Aqua Nightclub in Abuja.

Accolades
"Tease Me/Bad Guys" was nominated for Hottest Single of the Year at the 2011 Nigeria Entertainment Awards.

References

2011 songs
2011 singles
Wizkid songs
Songs written by Wizkid